Sadat Mahalleh (also Romanized as Sādāt Maḩalleh; also known as Sa‘dat and Sadat Mahalleh Hoomeh) is a village in Chaf Rural District, in the Central District of Langarud County, Gilan Province, Iran. At the 2006 census, its population was 950, in 267 families.

References 

Populated places in Langarud County